Yvette Cason is an American television, theatre, and film actress, and a former Miss Black America from Washington, D.C.

Career 
Cason was an understudy for the character of Effie White in the original 1981 Broadway musical Dreamgirls, 1985 international tour, and 1987 Broadway revival. In 2006, she played May, the mother of Deena Jones, portrayed by Beyoncé Knowles in the feature film version of Dreamgirls. She also appeared in an episode of the sitcom The King of Queens as Mrs. Blanchard in the episode "Road Rayge". Her early musical training (while growing up in Washington, DC) was at The Sewell Music Conservatory.

Cason played Dahlia, the wicked stepmother, in the original 1996 run of Sisterella. It was said that the character was played "with exquisite relish" by Cason.

Filmography

Film

Television

External links

References 

Year of birth missing (living people)
Living people
African-American actresses
Actresses from Washington, D.C.
Miss Black America delegates
African-American beauty pageant winners
21st-century African-American people
21st-century African-American women